The 1927 Miami Hurricanes football team represented the University of Miami during the 1927 college football season. It was the team's first varsity squad.

Schedule

References

Miami
Miami Hurricanes football seasons
Miami Hurricanes football